Birds described in 1893 include Attwater's prairie chicken, the Auckland rail, blue-winged racket-tail, black-winged petrel, Laysan albatross, Chatham petrel, Mauritius night heron, Mauritius scops owl, purple-breasted sunbird, violet-throated metaltail, white-bellied tyrannulet, Whyte's barbet and the white-bellied crested flycatcher.

Events
Deaths of Francis Orpen Morris, Léon Olphe-Galliard, William Ruxton Davison and August Carl Eduard Baldamus.
Ornithologische Monatsberichte Berlin: Verlag von R. Friedländer & Sohn commences.
Johann Büttikofer joins the Nieuwenhuis Expedition to central Borneo.
Witmer Stone becomes Assistant Curator at The Academy of Natural Sciences of Philadelphia.

Publications
Henry Edwin Barnes (1893). "On the Birds of Aden". The Ibis.
Joel Asaph Allen (1893). "On a collection of birds from Chapada, Matto Grosso, Brazil, made by Mr. Herbert H. Smith. Part 1, Oscines". Bulletin of the American Museum of Natural History. 3 (24).
Alfred Newton (assisted by Hans Gadow, with contributions from Richard Lydekker, Charles S. Roy and Robert Shufeldt) (1893–1896). A Dictionary of Birds. Black.
Émile Oustalet (1893). La Protection des oiseaux [The Protection of Birds]. Reprinted in 1895 & re-edited in 1900.

Ongoing events
Osbert Salvin and Frederick DuCane Godman (1879–1904). Biologia Centrali-Americana Aves.
Richard Bowdler Sharpe (1874-1898). Catalogue of the Birds in the British Museum London.
Eugene W. Oates and William Thomas Blanford (1889–1898). The Fauna of British India, Including Ceylon and Burma: Birds Volumes I–IV.
Anton Reichenow, Jean Cabanis, and other members of the German Ornithologists' Society in Journal für Ornithologie
Ornis; internationale Zeitschrift für die gesammte Ornithologie.Vienna 1885-1905online BHL
The Ibis
The Auk online BHL

References

Bird
Birding and ornithology by year